J-XX J-X, and XXJ are names applied by Western intelligence agencies to describe programs by the People's Republic of China to develop one or more fifth-generation fighter aircraft. General He Weirong, Chief of Staff of the People's Liberation Army Air Force (PLAAF), stated that China had several such programs underway and that an undesignated fifth-generation fighter developed jointly by Chengdu Aerospace Corporation and Shenyang Aerospace Corporation would be in service by 2018.

History
The PLAAF unveiled the program in late 2002. A December 2002 Jane's Defence Weekly reported that Shenyang Aerospace Corporation had been selected to head research and development of the new fighter, which was also stated in the New Scientist the same week. Also, a 2006 article in Military Technology referred to three designs; two by Shenyang Aerospace Corporation and one by Chengdu Aerospace Corporation.

According to Jane's, development of the subsystems, including an engine with thrust vectoring capability, and weapon suite for the next generation fighter had been under development. A photograph of a wind tunnel model published with the article showed a twin-engine aircraft with twin vertical tail fins. The aircraft would carry its weapons internally like the F-22 Raptor. New Scientist called attention to the angular, faceted features of the design, comparing them to the F-117 Nighthawk.

The article in Military Technology featured a picture of a completely different design, speculatively called J-14 and said to be a Shenyang project, with the designations J-12 and J-13 being applied to competing designs by Shenyang and Chengdu respectively. Since 2009, comments on the Chinese internet have indicated to a merging of the two efforts, to be named J-14. Chengdu was rumored to be responsible for the airframe, while Shenyang would be responsible for the engines and avionics.

In November 2009, General He Weirong, the Deputy Commander of the People's Liberation Army Air Force confirmed research and development of the 5th generation stealth fighter, and gave a possible in-service date of 2017 to 2019.

A U.S. Defense Intelligence Agency official commenting on General He's statements indicated the DIA believes a first flight of the J-XX "will occur in the next few years". The U.S. Department of Defense expects China to have a handful of 5th generation fighters in service between 2020 and 2025, according to statements made by U.S. Secretary of Defense Robert M. Gates in July 2009. However, a year later, in May 2010, United States intelligence stated that Chinese 5th generation fighter jets will be expected around 2018. In 2011, Gates changed his position to state that China may have 50 stealth fighters by 2020 and a couple of hundred by 2025.

Design
The general design concept of the J-XX is that of a fifth-generation fighter which incorporates stealth, supercruise, super-maneuverability and short take-off capabilities, abbreviated "4S". One or more of the proposed designs are believed to incorporate several design features for increasing stealth and maneuverability while decreasing weight and drag.

The Chinese state television broadcaster China Central Television (CCTV) asserts:

A V-shaped pelikan tail could be implemented, replacing conventional vertical tail fins and horizontal stabiliser structures. This would be beneficial for reduction of radar signature, weight and aerodynamic drag, since control surface area and corresponding control mechanisms are reduced. Problems faced by this type of design are flight control system complexity and control surface loading. If the pelikan tail is adopted, use of engines with thrust vector control may alleviate these problems.

[...] The new fighter may have a significantly longer fuselage than other fifth generation fighter designs, such as the F-22, for reduction of transonic and supersonic drag. A trapezoidal wing may be implemented for reduction of drag and radar signature. Use of an 's'-shaped air inlet and boundary layer separation system would greatly reduce radar signature.

A fifth generation fighter remains an ambitious goal for the PRC, because they are behind in the needed technologies such as aerospace-grade carbon fiber, advanced fighter engines, and AESA radar.

Chengdu J-20

The Chengdu J-20 stealth fighter conducted its first flight on January 11, 2011 and entered service in 2017.

Shenyang J-XX and FC-31
Shenyang Aircraft Corporation had a proposed J-XX aircraft that was larger than the J-20. In 2008, the PLAAF endorsed Chengdu Aerospace Corporation's proposal, Project 718 (J-20); Shenyang lost its bid, then chose to develop an export oriented fighter called FC-31. The Shenyang FC-31 Stealth fighter conducted its first flight in October 31, 2012.

Xian H-20
The Xian H-20 is a subsonic stealth bomber design due to enter service in the future.

JH-XX
The JH-XX is a supersonic, stealth, tactical bomber/fighter-bomber aircraft under development. JH-XX is the second stealth bomber of China confirmed in existence by the U.S. intelligence community, and the Pentagon speculates the fighter-bomber is capable of long range strike and nuclear weapons delivery.

See also
Chengdu J-20
Shenyang J-31

References

Citations

Sources 
  (English translation using Google Translate) Original CCTV hosted video

External links
 Sinodefence J-XX

J-XX, Shenyang
Shenyang aircraft
Chengdu aircraft
Stealth aircraft

fr:J-XX
ru:Shenyang J-20